The Armenian Customs Service is a subsidiary department of the State Revenue Committee responsible for customs services on behalf of the Armenian government, headquartered in Yerevan.

History
The Armenian Customs Service is the authoritative body which regulates customs services in Armenia, ensures compliance of Armenia's international trade and customs agreements, and is responsible for the collection of customs payments and tariffs for foreign trade. The department was established on 4 January 1992 and ensures that customs regulations are followed for incoming trade and goods to Armenia. Department staff are also responsible to ensure that contraband items which are prohibited for entry are monitored at all checkpoints. Between 2018 and 2020, the Armenian Customs Service was nominated to represent the Audit Committee of the World Customs Organization, representing the European region alongside the Tax and Customs Administration of the Netherlands.

International cooperation

Bilateral agreements
The Armenian Customs Service maintains bilateral customs agreements with the following countries: Austria, Argentina, Belarus, Bulgaria, China, Egypt, Georgia, Greece, Iran, Italy, Latvia, Lebanon, Moldova, Kazakhstan, Kyrgyzstan, Tajikistan, Turkmenistan, Ukraine, and the United Arab Emirates. 
In 2013, the department held training events with U.S. Customs and Border Protection delegates, with the goal to modernize customs services and improve inspection quality. A similar event was held in 2014. In 2017, representatives from the department held cooperation talks with the Federal Customs Service of Russia. In 2021, the Armenian Customs Service launched a twinning partnership jointly with the Finnish Customs and Lithuanian customs services.

Multilateral cooperation 
Within the framework of the European Neighbourhood Policy, Armenia and the European Union have agreements to deepen and expand Armenia-EU relations. The Armenia-EU Comprehensive and Enhanced Partnership Agreement was ratified in March 2021, which facilitates and enhances EU-Armenian trade relations, including harmonizing Armenian customs regulations to EU standards.

Armenia is a member of the Eurasian Economic Union, which maintains a customs union and free trade zone among five countries in Eurasia. Similarly, Armenia is a member of the Commonwealth of Independent States, which maintains its own customs legislations and rules among all members.  Armenia is also a full member of the World Customs Organization and the World Trade Organization.

Multilateral agreements 
In addition, Armenia has signed several customs and trade regulatory treaties, including the:
CMR Convention
Convention on Psychotropic Substances
Customs Convention on Containers
General Agreement on Tariffs and Trade
International Convention on the Harmonization of Frontier Controls of Goods
Montreal Convention
The Istanbul Convention on Temporary Admission
TIR Convention
TRACECA

See also

 Economy of Armenia
 Member states of the World Customs Organization
 Ministry of Finance (Armenia)
 Transport in Armenia

References

External links
 Armenian Customs Service official website

Government ministries of Armenia
Customs services
Customs duties
International taxation
Export and import control
Government agencies established in 1992